Good Old Schooldays is a 1930 American film produced by The Van Beuren Corporation and released by Pathe. The film, which features Milton and Rita Mouse, was directed by John Foster and Mannie Davis.

Released on March 7, 1930, the film takes place inside of a schoolhouse, and is part of a series entitled Aesop's Sound Fables, though its plot has no relation to the fables.

Characters
As with many of the Aesop Sound Fables at that time, this cartoon featured both Milton and Rita Mouse. There are also other characters, like goats, dogs, and mice.

Plot

The film starts with many species of animals traveling to school, to the tune of the spelling song Mississippi. The teacher then rings a bell to signal the start of lessons. In response, she is flung about by the excited students entering the school. The children sing "My Country, 'Tis of Thee", which was a de facto anthem for America at that time. After the singing, an animal gives the teacher an apple, before taking it back and eating it when the teacher isn't looking. Rita then plays a piano, and Milton sings a song. However, he forgets the words and begins to sing phrases of nonsense. After the performance, the teacher asks a mouse (named Willie Jones) in the class if he has written his composition yet. Jones says no, but he can whistle "the theme song". He then brings out a flute and starts to play. The other animals join in, using both themselves and various items as instruments. These include a goat using his dunce cap as a trumpet, the elephant using his trunk as a trombone, and several ducks using their beaks as a xylophone. Due to the music, the schoolhouse comically dances. As a result of the dancing, the building collapses and all the animals run out of it.

The film ends with an unrelated short cartoon featuring a man and a woman. The man states that "A Powdered Nose is No Guarantee of a Clean Neck." This angers the lady, who trips him with her foot and hits him in the head with her purse.

Reception 
Good Old Schooldays received mixed reviews in the cinema review magazines at that time. The cartoon was featured as ''Okay'' by the Motion Picture News. The magazine said that whilst "This release has sufficient merriment to tickle the sides of the crabbish", the magazine criticised the lack of amusing gags and the magazine's closing note for the cartoon was that it was "Okay for a heavy feature". The cartoon was viewed more favorable by The Film Daily, who said the film was a "highly amusing filler".

References

External links 
 
 

1930 films
1930s American animated films
1930 animated films
American black-and-white films